Susthitavarman (also known as Sri-Mriganka) (590-595) was a ruler of Kamarupa.  He was a son of Sthitavarman and Queen Nayanadevi.

Reign
Susthitavarman was renowned as Sri-Mriganka. He was succeeded by his two sons, Supratisthitavarman and Bhaskaravarman one after the other. Though Harsha Charita  states Bhaskaravarman succeeded his father directly, Bhaskarvarman's own inscription states he came to power after his brother had ruled for a while.

See also
 Chandramukhavarman
 Bhaskarvarman

References

Further reading
  
 
 
 
 
 
 
 
 
 
 
 
 

Varman dynasty
6th-century Indian monarchs